"Broadway" is a song by Sébastien Tellier from his 2004 album Politics. It was released as a single on February 6, 2006. As well as the original version, the single included a number of remixes and another song by Tellier, Le Long De La Riviere Tendre. The song's lyrics mention "Private Rico"; this refers to the character Juan Rico from Robert A. Heinlein's book Starship Troopers.

References

See also
 Politics, album by Sébastien Tellier
 Starship Troopers

2004 songs
Sébastien Tellier songs